Diocese of Assam may refer to the following ecclesiastical jurisdictions in Assam, northeastern India :

 the former Anglican Diocese of Assam, now the Church of North India Diocese of North East India
 the former Latin Catholic Apostolic Prefecture of Assam, now the Metropolitan Archdiocese of Shillong